Harley Quinn is an American adult animated dark comedy superhero streaming television series based on the DC Comics character of the same name created by Paul Dini and Bruce Timm. The series is written and executive-produced by Justin Halpern, Patrick Schumacker and Dean Lorey, and follows the misadventures of Harley Quinn and her best friend (and eventual lover), Poison Ivy, after leaving her boyfriend, the Joker. The show premiered on DC Universe to critical acclaim on November 29, 2019, with critics praising its animation, humor, dark tone, voice acting, and portrayal of the titular protagonist.

The show's second season premiered on April 3, 2020. On September 18, 2020, the series was officially renewed for a third season, along with the announcement that the show would move to HBO Max, following the restructuring of DC Universe. The third season premiered on July 28, 2022. On August 31, 2022, the series was renewed for a fourth season. A standalone 44-minute special episode, titled "A Very Problematic Valentine's Day Special", premiered on February 9, 2023.

Overview

Premise
The series follows Harley Quinn's misadventures and journey of self-discovery after breaking up with the Joker upon the realization that he does not love her.

Season 1
The first season focuses on Harley's attempts to prove herself as a competent villain in order to join the Legion of Doom, starting with the formation of her own crew consisting of Poison Ivy, Clayface, Doctor Psycho, King Shark, and Sy Borgman. When she finally achieves this goal, however, she inadvertently distances herself from her newfound friends and continues to face problems from the Joker, who cannot stand the idea of Harley being a successful supervillain without him. In the season one finale, the Joker manages to take over Gotham City, only to be defeated by Harley and her crew. In a final act of retaliation, he destroys the entire city, resulting in his and Batman's apparent deaths.

Season 2
In the second season, Gotham has become a no man's land, allowing the newly formed Injustice League—consisting of the Penguin, the Riddler, Mr. Freeze, Two-Face, and Bane—to take over the city's ruins. After they refuse to let Harley join them, she works with her crew to eliminate them one by one in order to claim Gotham for herself; in the process unwittingly inspiring Barbara Gordon to become Batgirl. Meanwhile, both the Joker and Batman are revealed to be alive; albeit with the former now sane, with no memory of his old self, and the latter unable to fight crime due to his injuries. Following the Injustice League's defeat, Commissioner Gordon restores order to Gotham while Harley begins to develop feelings for Ivy.

Concurrently, Doctor Psycho leaves the crew to exact revenge on Harley for under-appreciating him and manages to take over Gotham with a Parademon army he obtained from Darkseid. To stop him, Harley joins forces with the Justice League, Gordon, and the Joker; reluctantly restoring the latter back to his former self in the process. Although Psycho is defeated in the end, he retaliates by revealing Harley and Ivy had sex right before the latter's wedding with Kite Man. Though Ivy and Kite Man attempt to continue on, Gordon, annoyed that he did not receive any recognition for saving Gotham, attempts to bust their wedding. Amidst the chaos, Kite Man realizes Ivy does not love him and breaks up with her. While escaping from the police together, Ivy finally admits her feelings for Harley.

A six-issue comic miniseries entitled The Eat Bang Kill Tour is set immediately after Season 2. Here, Harley and Ivy go on a road trip cross-country and encounter numerous heroes such as Vixen and Nightwing. All the while they are constantly on the run from Gordon, who has gone insane with determination to bring both of them in, regardless of how many people get hurt in his way. This prompts Batman and Batgirl to try to stop him before he causes any more damage.

Season 3
In the third season, after reforming their crew, Harley and Ivy make plans to terraform the planet, while also dealing with problems that arise from their newfound status as a couple. After Ivy's pet plant Frank goes missing, she and Harley begin searching for him, unaware that Frank has been captured by Batman, whose relationship with Catwoman is failing and now seeks to use Frank's mutant powers to resurrect his parents Thomas and Martha Wayne. Meanwhile, Gordon continues his mission to capture Harley and Ivy, while also running for mayor, assisted by Two-Face, who seeks to become district attorney again and proves to be a negative influence for Gordon. After realizing this, Gordon ends his partnership with Two-Face and steps back from the election, allowing the Joker to become the new mayor of Gotham.

Eventually, Harley and Ivy discover Frank has been taken by Bruce Wayne and the former kidnaps him before enlisting Doctor Psycho's help to get inside his mind and learn Frank's whereabouts. In the process, Harley discovers Bruce's identity as Batman and his trauma over his parents' murder, but is unable to help him overcome it, leading Bruce to resurrect his parents as plant zombies; inadvertently starting a zombie apocalypse in the process. Ivy is able to take control of the zombies with the power of the Green, but plans to use them to accomplish her dream of making the Earth a plant haven, forcing Harley to stop her with the Bat-family's help. While Ivy forgives her for this, Harley is hailed as a hero for her actions and realizes she enjoys doing good, leading her to continue helping Bruce as his therapist. After Bruce is arrested for his crimes, he asks Batgirl to lead Bat-family in his absence, with Harley as its newest member.

A second six-issue miniseries titled Legion of Bats! takes place after the events of Season 3. It follows Harley as she has an identity crisis and works with the Bat Family, keeping her actions a secret from Ivy. Meanwhile, Ivy attempts to build an all-female Legion of Doom as its new boss, and new villains including Black Mask rise up to take over Gotham.

Cast and characters

Main
 Kaley Cuoco as Dr. Harleen Quinzel / Harley Quinn, Kylie Kryptonite
 Lake Bell as Poison Ivy, Cheryl, Barbara Kean, Britney Bionic
 Alan Tudyk as the Joker, Clayface, Calendar Man, Doctor Trap, Condiment King, Firefly, Ocean Master, Kevin
 Ron Funches as King Shark
 Tony Hale as Doctor Psycho, Felix Faust 
 Jason Alexander as Sy Borgman

Supporting

 Diedrich Bader as Bruce Wayne / Batman, Thomas Wayne, Steve, No Pinkie Pete
 James Adomian as Bane, Chaz, Ian, Ratcatcher, Clock King, Nelvin Eckles 
 Krizia Bajos as Bethany (season 3)
 Tisha Campbell as Amanda Waller, Tawny Young, Janice, M.O.N.I.C.A.
 Briana Cuoco as Barbara Gordon / Batgirl
 Andy Daly as Harvey Dent / Two-Face, the President, Mister Miracle, Darryl Brown, Mr. Covington, High Owl
 Rachel Dratch as Nora Fries, Queen Hippolyta
 Giancarlo Esposito as Lex Luthor
 Larissa Gallagher as Prawn
 Sean Giambrone as Joshua Cobblepot
 Harvey Guillén as Dick Grayson / Nightwing
 James Gunn as himself 
 Mary Holland as Jennifer, Tabitha
 Tom Hollander as Alfred Pennyworth / The Macaroni
 Michael Ironside as Darkseid
 Wayne Knight as the Penguin
 Rahul Kohli as the Scarecrow
 Phil LaMarr as Jason Praxis, Black Manta, Lucius Fox, Brian, Samson, Shark God
 Sanaa Lathan as Selina Kyle / Catwoman
 Justina Machado as Bethany (season 2)
 Vanessa Marshall as Wonder Woman, Giganta, Joey Day
 Christopher Meloni as Commissioner James Gordon
 Alfred Molina as Mr. Freeze, Stew
 Matt Oberg as Kite Man, Killer Croc, KGBeast, Fred 
 Jim Rash as the Riddler, Stan, Mr. Isley, Jor-El, Tad, Luigi, Gotham City Mayor, Imperceptible Man
 Sam Richardson as Alec Holland / Swamp Thing
 Will Sasso as Maxie Zeus
 Rory Scovel as Gus
 J. B. Smoove as Frank the Plant
 Wanda Sykes as Queen of Fables
 Jacob Tremblay as Damian Wayne / Robin
 James Wolk as Superman

Guest voices

 Charlie Adler as Nick Quinzel, Grandpa Quinzel
 Cathy Ang as Golden Glider
 Leila Birch as Enchantress
 Quinta Brunson as Hawkgirl
 James Corleto as Benicio
 Chris Diamantopoulos as Aquaman
 Susie Essman as Sharon Quinzel, Grandma Quinzel
 Brett Goldstein as himself
 Maryl Hathaway as Marcus 
 Josh Helman as George Harkness / Captain Boomerang
 Jameela Jamil as Eris
 Tom Kenny as Clayface's Hand
 George Lopez as himself
 Howie Mandel as himself
 Natalie Morales as Lois Lane
 Brad Morris as Victor Zsasz
 Frankie Muniz as himself
 Suzy Nakamura as Realtor
 Griffin Newman as Jervis Tetch / the Mad Hatter
 Larry Owens as Music Meister
 Rhea Perlman as Golda
 Jonah Platt as Clayface (singing voice)
 Scott Porter as the Flash
 Matt Ryan as John Constantine
 Amy Sedaris as Debbie
 John Stamos as Etrigan the Demon
 Jack Stanton as Young Bruce Wayne
 Nicole Sullivan as Mrs. Cobblepot, Benjamin
 Billy Bob Thornton as himself
 Janet Varney as Mera
 Kari Wahlgren as Plastique, Elizabeth II
 Jessica Walter as Granny Goodness, Wendy Brown 
 Mark Whitten as Herman Cizko / The Cowled Critic
 Gary Anthony Williams as the Shark Priest, Prince Shark
 Tyler James Williams as Hawkman
 Casey Wilson as Betty

Episodes

Season 1 (2019–20)

Season 2 (2020)

Season 3 (2022)

Special (2023)

Production

Development
On November 20, 2017, it was announced that the then-unnamed DC Universe had ordered 26 episodes of Harley Quinn, a half-hour adult animated action-comedy series created and written by Justin Halpern, Patrick Schumacker and Dean Lorey. Executive producers were set to include Halpern, Schumacker, Lorey, and Sam Register with Jennifer Coyle serving as a producer. Production companies involved in the series were slated to consist of Ehsugadee Productions and Warner Bros. Animation. The first season consists of 13 episodes of the initial 26-episode order. Animation work is provided by NE4U, Digital eMation and Maven Image Platform in South Korea.

In June 2018, it was announced that the series would premiere in 2019. In October, it was further mapped as an October 2019 premiere. It was also reported that Kaley Cuoco would also serve as an executive producer for the series through her production company Yes, Norman Productions.

It was revealed that a second season was produced and consisted of another 13 episodes.

On September 18, 2020, three months after the second-season finale, it was announced that the series had been renewed for a third season, and would move to HBO Max. In February 2021, series creator Patrick Schumacker announced that they had begun recording season 3.

In June 2021, it was revealed that a planned oral sex scene between Catwoman and Batman in season 3 was cut by DC. It was replaced by a scene of Batman not being good at giving Catwoman a foot massage.

Schumacker stated the third season was more difficult to produce, but it will be much simpler not having to create two seasons back to back. Halpern has stated in an interview with Entertainment Weekly that season 3 will explore Harley's reaction to a half healthy relationship with Ivy as well as focusing more on Ivy's backstory as the previous two seasons were mainly focused on Harley. Schumacker said that new writers from the LGBTQ+ community have been hired because of the direction of season 2 and that it is a priority to diversify the staff for season 3. Schumacker also revealed that Dean Lorey would no longer be available to return as showrunner for season 3 and would be replaced by new co-showrunners Chrissy Pietrosh and Jessica Goldstein alongside him and Justin Halpern. Composer Jefferson Friedman revealed there would be a musical episode coming, and also stated that he wanted to refresh the music to give identity for each character. During an interview with Deadline Hollywood, Schumacker stated that his desire was to open season 3 on "an actual Zoom, where the GCPD is just being berated by the city of Gotham for their ineptitude". In February 2021, series creator Patrick Schumacker announced that they had begun recording season 3.

At DC FanDome 2021, Harley, King Shark, and Kite Man previewed some animatic footage from the third season, and announced it would be coming to HBO Max "sometime in 2022".

A comic prequel to season 3 was first released on August 3, 2021, under the title Harley Quinn: The Animated Series – The Eat. Bang! Kill. Tour by Tee Franklin (author), Max Sarin (cover art, penciller, inker), and Marissa Louise (colorist), in which Harley takes Ivy on a honeymoon where they face friends they've betrayed, their own feelings about how season 2 ended, and a few villains and heroes along the way. Commissioner Gordon tries to catch them repeatedly, causing Batman and Batgirl to worry about his sanity.

On August 9, 2022, it was announced that a fourth season is in development. On August 31, 2022, HBO Max renewed the series for a fourth season with Sarah Peters promoted to executive producer and showrunner, since Halpern and Schumacker will be busy with Noonan's. On October 7, 2022, it was reported that the series is getting a holiday special called "Harley Quinn: A Very Problematic Valentine's Day Special" which was released in February 2023.

Casting
Alongside the series order announcement, it was reported that the producers of the series were expected to approach Margot Robbie, who portrays the character in the DC Extended Universe (DCEU), to reprise the role; but this was false. In an interview after the season 1 release, Halpern went on record saying Robbie was kept in the loop, but she was never interested in playing the role since she was filming and producing Birds of Prey at the time. Other characters expected to be featured in the series included Joker, Poison Ivy, Sy Borgman, Doctor Psycho, Malice Vundabar, King Shark, and Clayface.

On October 3, 2018, it was announced that Cuoco would voice Harley Quinn and Lake Bell would voice Poison Ivy. Additional voice actors in the series include Alan Tudyk as Joker and Clayface, Ron Funches as King Shark, J. B. Smoove as Frank the Plant, Jason Alexander as Sy Borgman, Wanda Sykes as the Queen of Fables, Giancarlo Esposito as Lex Luthor, Natalie Morales as Lois Lane, Jim Rash as Riddler, Diedrich Bader reprising his role from Batman: The Brave and the Bold as Batman himself, Tony Hale as Dr. Psycho and Christopher Meloni as James Gordon. Shortly after, Rahul Kohli revealed he would voice Scarecrow in the series. In June 2019, Sanaa Lathan was revealed to be voicing Catwoman, who was depicted as African-American. On July 24, 2019, Vanessa Marshall revealed to be reprising Wonder Woman from Justice League: Crisis on Two Earths and Justice League: The Flashpoint Paradox. While on the following day, TV Guide revealed that veteran voice actor Charlie Adler has been confirmed to serve as the series' additional voice director with Schumacker and Lorey serving as the voice directors. In February 2020, Alfred Molina was announced to be voicing Mr. Freeze. In April 2020, Schumacker confirmed that Michael Ironside would be reprising his role as Darkseid from both the DC Animated Universe and the Lego DC Super-Villains video game.

In June 2021, Sam Richardson was announced as having joined the cast as Swamp Thing. In March 2022, filmmaker–later co-chairman and co-CEO of DC Studios, James Gunn announced he will voice himself in the show's third season; the showrunners contacted him on Twitter about making an appearance, knowing he was a fan of the show. Gunn recorded his lines remotely, as he was directing his DCEU series Peacemaker in Vancouver, Canada, while season 3 was being developed. That same month, Harvey Guillén was cast to play Nightwing.

Music
Jefferson Friedman composed the music for the series. WaterTower Music released the soundtrack album for season 1 on August 21, 2020. The season 2 album was released on the same day.

LGBTQ representation

In the DC Universe, Harley Quinn (Dr. Harleen Quinzel) and Poison Ivy (Dr. Pamela Isley) started as friends. In the comics, Harley and Ivy even referred to each other as "Peanut" and "Pam-A-Lamb". The writers took notice giving them moments of birthday kisses and taking showers together making their friendship more intimate. Harley Quinn's and Poison Ivy's relationship took a turn in Gotham City Sirens when Harley whispers into Ivy's ear that the reason she "saves her" from the Joker is due to her romantic feelings for her, although the scene ends with Harley going back to Joker. It was not until the 2013 Amanda Connor and Jimmy Palmiotti's Harley Quinn comic series where they are shown in a romantic coupling instead of friendship. Harley refers to Ivy as her "hot girlfriend" and the two are in an open relationship where they can pursue other partners while remaining dedicated to each other. Outside the main universe, Harley and Ivy even got married in Injustice 2.

In the May 15, 2020, episode "There's No Place to Go But Down" Harley Quinn saved her partner-in-crime, Poison Ivy; both kissed each other after they escaped from prison. The critic who reviewed the episode stated that Harley and Ivy's romance was a "slow burn", adding that this love affair could turn into a "more realistic exploration of how it feels to fall in love with a friend or to have an awkward hookup with a workmate". Another reviewer, Sophie Perry, writing for a lesbian lifestyle magazine, Curve, noted how queerbaiting has long endured in LGBTQ+ representation, noting how She-Ra and Harley Quinn both had same-sex kisses, happening within stories which could have turned out to be "typical queerbaiting" but did not. In another episode, Clayface, a member of Harley's villain crew, was revealed as a gay character who had a crush on a male student.

In June 2020, in an AMA on Reddit, Justin Halpern, co-showrunner of the series, admitted that the show missed subverting the trope of bisexuals being cheaters or prone to infidelity and promised to do better in the third season. Halpern also said, in later comments, that the show takes representation seriously, that both Harley and Ivy had relationships with women before, that Ivy had a crush on Catwoman, and explained how the relationship between Harley and Ivy developed.

In 2021, the series was nominated for a GLAAD Media Award for Outstanding Comedy Series. The series was also nominated for several awards at Autostraddle’s 4th Annual Gay Emmys, in the categories of "Best Episode with LGBTQ+ Themes" for the episode "Something Borrowed," and "Outstanding Animated Series". The trailer for the show's third season, which came out in October 2021, was described as showing that the series is "for the gays".

Release
Harley Quinn premiered on DC Universe on November 29, 2019. On October 3, 2018, ahead of the annual New York Comic Con, a teaser trailer featuring Harley Quinn, Poison Ivy and Batman in Arkham was released. A full, uncensored trailer set to Joan Jett's cover of the theme song from The Mary Tyler Moore Show was released on July 20, 2019, to coincide with the panel at San Diego Comic-Con.

On December 8, 2019, the first episode was shown as a special presentation on TBS. Season 1 started airing on Syfy on May 3, 2020. The series has aired on Adult Swim in Canada, with new episodes airing a week after their American premiere. The series started airing on E4 in the United Kingdom and Ireland on May 7, 2020. The series debuted on HBO Max on August 1, 2020. In the United States, Adult Swim's Toonami programming block aired a marathon of the first season on the night of August 7–8, 2021. On June 23, 2022, the series began airing on TNT. In Eastern Europe, the series became available on March 8, 2022, via HBO Max.

The second season was available to stream on April 3, 2020, on DC Universe.
An original short featuring Harley answering questions from fans was released online during DC FanDome in 2020.

The first three episodes of season 3 were released on July 28, 2022, on HBO Max, with the remaining seven episodes released weekly until September 15, 2022.

Home media 
The first season was released on DVD on June 2, 2020, and the second season was released on February 16, 2021, by Warner Bros. Home Entertainment. The first two seasons were also released on Blu-ray by Warner Bros. Home Entertainment under the Warner Archive Collection on February 16, 2021.

Digitally, the first two seasons are also available for digital purchase on Amazon Prime Video and iTunes.

Reception

Audience viewership 
According to Reelgood, Harley Quinn has ranked among the top 30 comic book TV shows across all streaming services. According to Parrot Analytics, since the pandemic began, the series has ranked among the top 10 most in-demand digital series in five months and ranked as HBO Max’s 8th most in-demand series overall domestically.

Critical response

On Rotten Tomatoes, the first season has an approval rating of 89% based on 37 reviews, with an average rating of 8/10. The website's critical consensus reads, "A strong voice cast and an even stronger grasp of what makes its titular antiheroine so beloved make Harley Quinn a violently delightful—and surprisingly insightful—addition to the DC animated universe." The second season has an approval rating of 100% based on 25 reviews with an average rating of 8.6/10, and a critical consensus stating, "Harley Quinn maintains its frenetic energy and humor while doubling down on the shenanigans and giving its titular anti-heroine even more room to play." The third season has an approval rating of 100% based on 25 reviews with an average rating of 8.8/10, and a critical consensus stating, "Who woulda thought? — Harley Quinn graduates from a ribald spoof into one of the most heartening additions to the DC canon in a diabolically clever and emotionally textured third season." On Metacritic, the show has a weighted average score of 82 out of 100, based on reviews from 7 critics, indicating "universal acclaim".

Caroline Framke of Variety wrote: "The animation feels like that of a typical Saturday morning cartoon, but its acidic scripts and shocking bursts of gore reminds you that Harley Quinn is taking full advantage of airing on a streaming service without censors. ... Sharp voice performances across the board from actors clearly relishing the chance to play in this world also prove too fun to resist. ... Most importantly, Harley gets to be an entire person all her own, as heartbreakingly naive as she is wickedly strange and funny." Robyn Bahr of The Hollywood Reporter wrote: "It's one of the best surprises of the year. ... 13 zippy, violent and irreverent half-hour episodes. ... The writing is frequently uproarious, chock full of Millennial nostalgia and cerebral gallows humor (the former may be low-hanging, rapidly-perishable fruit, but at least the show knows how to embrace its audience)."

Accolades

Adaptations
Harley Quinn: The Animated Series: The Eat. Bang! Kill Tour: A 6-part series set between seasons 2 and 3 of the television series.
Harley Quinn: The Animated Series: The Real Sidekicks of New Gotham Special: A 6 stories one-shot special set after season 3 of the television series.
Harley Quinn: The Animated Series: Legion of Bats!: A series set after season 3 of the television series, where Harley Quinn joins Bat-Family, while Poison Ivy becomes Legion of Doom's leader.

Publications
Harley Quinn: The Animated Series Vol. 1: The Eat. Bang! Kill Tour (ISBN 978-1-77951-664-0/EAN-5 52499, 2022-08-30): Includes Harley Quinn: The Animated Series: The Eat. Bang! Kill Tour #1–6.
Harley Quinn: The Animated Series: The Real Sidekicks of New Gotham Special (2022-08-30): Includes Tawny Tawks, Double Date, Identity Crisis, Showtime!, Wild Rlde, Two Jokers.

Spin-off
Noonan's, a spin-off featuring Kite Man and his current girlfriend Golden Glider, is currently in development for HBO Max. The first season is set to comprise ten episodes, with Oberg returning to voice Kite-Man.

Notes

References

External links

DC page: HQ2019, HQTASTEBKT2021, HQTASTRSONGS2022, HQTASLOB2022
Harley Quinn at HBO Max

2010s American adult animated television series
2010s American black comedy television series
2010s American LGBT-related animated television series
2010s American LGBT-related comedy television series
2010s American superhero comedy television series
2019 American television series debuts
2020s American adult animated television series
2020s American black comedy television series
2020s American LGBT-related animated television series
2020s American LGBT-related comedy television series
2020s American superhero comedy television series
Adult animated television shows based on DC Comics
American action adventure television series
American adult animated action television series
American adult animated adventure television series
American adult animated comedy television series
American adult animated science fiction television series
American adult animated superhero television series
American crime comedy television series
Animated Batman television series
Animated superheroine television shows
Bisexuality-related television series
DC Universe (streaming service) original programming
English-language television shows
Harley Quinn in other media
HBO Max original programming
LGBT-related superhero television shows
American LGBT-related animated television series
Supervillain television shows
Television series about abuse
Television series about organized crime
Television series by Warner Bros. Animation
Television series by Warner Bros. Television Studios
Television series by Yes, Norman Productions
Studio Mir